Cassette may refer to:

Technology
 Cassette tape (or musicassette, audio cassette, cassette tape, or tape), a worldwide standard for analog audio recording and playback
 Cassette single (or "Cassingle"), a music single in the form of a cassette tape
 Digital Audio Tape (or DAT), a digital audio cassette tape format, mainly used by professionals
 Digital Compact Cassette (or DCC), a short-lived digital audio cassette format aimed at domestic users
 Videocassette, a cassette containing videotape, for use in VCRs
 Data cassette, the magnetic tape in plastic housing

Music
 Album (Public Image Ltd album), a 1986 Public Image Ltd album called "Cassette" on certain editions
 Cassette (New Zealand band), a band from New Zealand
 Cassette (South African band), a band from South Africa
 The Cassettes, a Washington, DC based "Mystic Country"/Steampunk band formed in 1999
 Cassette (Romania), a band from Romania

People 
 Benny Cassette, American record producer, singer, and songwriter
 Rafa Casette (sometimes misspelled as Rafa Cassette or Rafa Casete, born 1965), Spanish actor and singer

Other uses
 Gene cassette, certain vectors that are normally used to confer a selectable marker on an organism
 Cassette cogset, a set of multiple sprockets on a bicycle
 Cassette toilet, a type of portable camping toilet

See also
 Cartridge (disambiguation)